Platte County is a county located in the northwestern portion of the U.S. state of Missouri and is part of the Kansas City metropolitan area. As of the 2020 census, the population was 106,718. Its county seat is Platte City. The county was organized December 31, 1838, from the Platte Purchase, named for the Platte River. (Platte is derived from the French word for a low, shallow, or intermittent stream.) The Kansas City International Airport is located in the county, approximately one mile west of Interstate 29 between mile markers 12 and 15. The land for the airport was originally in an unincorporated portion of Platte County before being annexed by Platte City, and eventually Kansas City.

Geography

The county's southwestern border with Kansas is formed by the Missouri River.

Adjacent counties
Buchanan County (north)
Clinton County (northeast)
Clay County (east)
Wyandotte County, Kansas (south)
Leavenworth County, Kansas (southwest)
Atchison County, Kansas (northwest)

Major highways

 Interstate 29
 Interstate 435
 Interstate 635
 U.S. Route 71
 Route 9
 Route 45
 Route 92
 Route 152
 Route 273
 Route 371

Demographics

As of the census of 2000, there were 73,781 people, 29,278 households, and 20,231 families residing in the county.  The population density was 176 people per square mile (68/km2).  There were 30,902 housing units at an average density of 74 per square mile (28/km2).  The racial makeup of the county was 91.45% White, 3.49% Black or African American, 0.46% Native American, 1.48% Asian, 0.20% Pacific Islander, 1.05% from other races, and 1.87% from two or more races. Approximately 3.00% of the population were Hispanic or Latino of any race. 23.4% were of German, 12.5% Irish, 12.2% American and 11.4% English ancestry.

There were 29,278 households, out of which 34.10% had children under the age of 18 living with them, 57.00% were married couples living together, 8.80% had a female householder with no husband present, and 30.90% were non-families. 24.90% of all households were made up of individuals, and 6.00% had someone living alone who was 65 years of age or older.  The average household size was 2.49 and the average family size was 3.00.

In the county, the population was spread out, with 25.80% under the age of 18, 8.30% from 18 to 24, 32.60% from 25 to 44, 24.50% from 45 to 64, and 8.80% who were 65 years of age or older.  The median age was 36 years. For every 100 females there were 98.10 males.  For every 100 females age 18 and over, there were 95.50 males.

The median income for a household in the county was $55,849, and the median income for a family was $65,236. Males had a median income of $44,310 versus $31,005 for females. The per capita income for the county was $26,356.  About 3.30% of families and 4.80% of the population were below the poverty line, including 5.70% of those under age 18 and 5.70% of those age 65 or over.

2020 Census

Education

School districts
School districts (all full K-12) include:

 East Buchanan County C-1 School District
 North Kansas City 74 School District
 North Platte County R-I School District
 Park Hill School District
 Platte County R-III School District
 Smithville R-II School District
 West Platte County R-II School District

Public schools
North Platte R-I School District – Dearborn 
North Platte Elementary School (PK-03) 
North Platte Intermediate School (04-06) 
North Platte Junior High School (07-08) 
North Platte High School (09-12) 
Park Hill School District – Kansas City 
Russell Jones Education Center (K-12) – (Special Education)
Hopewell Elementary School (K-05)
Alfred L. Renner Elementary School (K-05) 
Thomas B. Chinn Elementary School (K-05)
English Landing Elementary School (K-05) 
Graden Elementary School (K-05) 
Hawthorn Elementary School (K-05) 
Line Creek Elementary School (K-05) 
Gerner Family Early Education Center (PK)
Prairie Point Elementary School (K-05) 
Southeast Elementary School (K-05) 
Tiffany Ridge Elementary School (K-05)
Union Chapel Elementary School (K-05) 
Congress Middle School (06-08) 
Lakeview Middle School (06-08) 
Plaza Middle School (06-08)
Walden Middle School (06-08)
Park Hill High School (09-12) -- within Kansas City city limits 
Park Hill South High School (09-12) – Riverside
LEAD Innovation Studio (09-12) 
Platte County R-III School District – Platte City 
Donald D. Siegrist Elementary School (K-5)
Pathfinder Elementary School (PK-5)
 Compass Elementary School (PK-5)
Barry Elementary School (PK-5)
Platte City Middle School (06-08) 
Platte County High School (09-12) 
West Platte County R-II School District – Weston 
Central Elementary School (PK-06) 
West Platte County High School (07-12)

Private schools
Clay-Platte Children’s House Montessori School – Kansas City (PK-08) – Nonsectarian
Martin Luther Academy – Kansas City (K-08) – Lutheran
Northland Christian Education System – Kansas City (PK-12) – Nondenominational Christian 
St. Therese School – Kansas City (K-08) – Roman Catholic
St. Pius X High School – Kansas City (09-12) – Roman Catholic 
Prairie View KinderCare – Kansas City (NS/PK) – Nonsectarian 
Christ Lutheran Pre-Kindergarten School – Platte Woods (NS/PK) – Lutheran
Our Savior Christian Academy - Platte City and Smithville (PK-12)

Public libraries
Mid-Continent Public Library

Politics

Local
The Republican Party controls politics at the local level in Platte County. Republicans hold all of the elected positions in the county. However, Governor Jay Nixon carried the county in his two successful elections, and in 2004, Claire McCaskill of Jackson County narrowly won a majority of the county's votes over Republican victor Matt Blunt.

State

Platte County is divided into four legislative districts in the Missouri House of Representatives, three held by Republicans and one held by a Democrat.

District 11 — Brenda Shields (R-St. Joseph). Consists of the communities of Dearborn, Edgerton, Tracy, and Weston. 

District 12 — Josh Hurlbert (R-Smithville). Consists of Camden Point, Platte City, and Ridgely.

District 13 — Sean Pouche (R-Kansas City). Consists of the communities of Farley, Ferrelview, Parkville, Waldron, Weatherby Lake, and a part of the city of Kansas City. 

District 14 – Ashley Aune (D-Kansas City). Consists of the communities of Houston Lake, Lake Waukomis, Northmoor, Platte Woods, Riverside, and part of the city of Kansas City.

All of Platte County is a part of Missouri's 34th District in the Missouri Senate and is currently represented by Tony Luetkemeyer (R-Parkville).

Federal

All of Platte County is included in Missouri's 6th Congressional District and is currently represented by Sam Graves (R-Tarkio) in the U.S. House of Representatives.

Missouri presidential preference primary (2008)

Former U.S. Senator Hillary Clinton (D-New York) received more votes, a total of 5,434, than any candidate from either party in Platte County during the 2008 presidential primary.

Communities

Cities

Camden Point
Dearborn
Edgerton
Houston Lake
Kansas City (partly in Jackson and Clay Counties and a small part in Cass County)
Lake Waukomis
Northmoor
Parkville
Platte City (county seat)
Platte Woods
Riverside
Smithville (mostly in Clay County)
Tracy
Weatherby Lake
Weston

Villages
Farley
Ferrelview
Iatan
Ridgely

Civil townships

 Carroll
 Fair
 Fox
 Green
 Kickapoo
 Lee
 Marshall
 May
 Pawnee
 Pettis
 Preston
 Sioux
 Waldron
 Weston

Unincorporated communities

Beverly
Dye
East Leavenworth
Edgerton Junction
Hoover
Kerrville
New Market
Stillings
Stubbs
Waldron
West Platte
Woodruff

See also
National Register of Historic Places listings in Platte County, Missouri

References

External links

Platte County Government's Website
Platte County Sheriff's Office Website
 Digitized 1930 Plat Book of Platte County  from University of Missouri Division of Special Collections, Archives, and Rare Books

 
1838 establishments in Missouri
Populated places established in 1838
Missouri counties on the Missouri River